New Haven is a town in Addison County, Vermont, United States. The population was 1,683 at the 2020 census. In addition to the town center, New Haven contains the communities of Belden (sometimes called Belden Falls), Brooksville, New Haven Junction and New Haven Mills.

Geography
New Haven is located in north-central Addison County, in the Champlain Valley. It is bordered by Ferrisburgh and Monkton to the north, Bristol to the east, Middlebury to the south, Weybridge to the southwest, and Waltham to the northwest. The town of Addison, west of Weybridge and Waltham, touches New Haven at one corner.

Otter Creek, one of the longest rivers in Vermont, forms part of the town's southwest border, with falls at Belden and Huntington Falls. The New Haven River, rising to the east in the Green Mountains, flows into Otter Creek at Brooksville.

U.S. Route 7 runs north-south through the town, connecting Vergennes and Middlebury. Vermont Route 17 crosses Route 7 at New Haven Junction and runs east into Bristol and west to Addison and the Crown Point Bridge over Lake Champlain into New York.

Demographics

As of the census of 2000, there were 1,666 people, 613 households, and 459 families residing in the town.  The population density was 40.0 people per square mile (15.4/km2).  There were 646 housing units at an average density of 15.5 per square mile (6.0/km2).  The racial makeup of the town was 98.26% White, 0.24% African American, 0.60% Native American, and 0.90% from two or more races. Hispanic or Latino of any race were 0.84% of the population.

There were 613 households, out of which 37.4% had children under the age of 18 living with them, 64.1% were married couples living together, 7.0% had a female householder with no husband present, and 25.0% were non-families. 16.0% of all households were made up of individuals, and 5.1% had someone living alone who was 65 years of age or older.  The average household size was 2.72 and the average family size was 3.09.

In the town, the age distribution of the population shows 27.0% under the age of 18, 7.3% from 18 to 24, 29.3% from 25 to 44, 27.0% from 45 to 64, and 9.5% who were 65 years of age or older.  The median age was 38 years. For every 100 females, there were 104.2 males.  For every 100 females age 18 and over, there were 105.8 males.

The median income for a household in the town was $47,014, and the median income for a family was $52,083. Males had a median income of $33,352 versus $22,721 for females. The per capita income for the town was $21,321.  About 3.8% of families and 5.1% of the population were below the poverty line, including 2.8% of those under age 18 and 4.9% of those age 65 or over.

Notable people 

 Christopher A. Bray, member of the Vermont House of Representatives and Vermont Senate
 Wolcott Turner Brooks, Wisconsin State Assemblyman
 Josiah Bushnell Grinnell, founder of Grinnell, Iowa, and benefactor of Grinnell College
 Homer Hulbert, missionary and activist for Korean independence
 Curtis M. Lampson, fur merchant, best remembered for his promotion of the transatlantic telegraph cable
 Robert Bruce Langdon, Minnesota State Senator and businessman
 Edward Pier, Wisconsin State Senator
 Royal T. Sprague, 11th Chief Justice of the Supreme Court of California
Allen R. Sturtevant, Associate Justice of the Vermont Supreme Court

References

External links
 Town of New Haven official website

 
Towns in Vermont
Towns in Addison County, Vermont